CY8ER (pronounced as "cyber") was a Japanese alternative idol girl group. Formed by Ichigo Rinahamu and Nicamoq as BPM15Q in 2015, the group expanded and had five members by the time of their dissolution in January 2021. Their music was characterized by its peculiar EDM style with an added kawaii element.

History
The name BPM15Q was chosen as a reference to the two members: 15 for Ichigo Rinahamu (One is pronounced ichi and five is pronounced go, putting them together made ichigo) and Q for Nicamoq. The duo began releasing a series of songs, out of which  peaked at 3rd on iTunes' J-pop charts. In November 2016, BPM15Q released their first album titled BPM15Q All Songs via Ichigo Rinahamu's own label, Icigo Style. The album contained all of the songs the duo has released so far. December also saw the departure of Nicamoq. With the changes, the group renamed itself to "CY8ER".

The six-person group soon made headlines for an event inviting fans to hug a member, but each member was wearing full chemical protective clothing. Naatan Koromushi left the group in March 2018. As of April 2014, four additional singles and one album were released.

The group disbanded on January 10, 2021, following their last live show at Nippon Budokan.

In April 2022, the original duo officially announced they will resuming their activities as BPM15Q under Victor Entertainment’s label.

Members

Final lineup 
Ichigo Rinahamu (苺りなはむ)
Koinumaru Pochi (小犬丸ぽち)
Suzukawa Mashiro (涼川ましろ)
Fujishiro Anna (藤城アンナ)
Yamiyume Yammy (病夢やみい)

Former members
Nicamoq (にかもきゅ)
Naatan Koromushi (なぁたんコロ虫)

Timeline

Discography

Studio albums

Compilation albums

Singles

References

Japanese idol groups
Japanese girl groups
Musical groups established in 2015
Musical groups disestablished in 2021
2015 establishments in Japan
2021 disestablishments in Japan
Japanese pop music groups
Japanese electronic musicians